Molly: An American Girl on the Home Front is the third movie in the American Girl film series, but is the first to premiere on the Disney Channel. The first two movies in the series were broadcast on The WB Television Network, but the series moved since it no longer fit in with its original network following the WB/UPN merger. It premiered on November 26, 2006, but was not tagged as a Disney Channel Original Movie. The film stars Maya Ritter in the title role, with Molly Ringwald, David Aaron Baker, Tory Green and Genevieve Farrell in supporting roles.

The screenwriter, Anna Sandor, won the 2007 Humanitas Prize for the movie.

Plot
Based on the "Molly: An American Girl" book series, the film is set during World War II. Molly McIntire lives in Jefferson County, Illinois with her parents, James and Helen, and two older siblings, Jill and Ricky. James is an Army doctor. Molly is in the third grade at Willow Street School along with her two best friends, Linda and Susan. As Molly's 10th birthday nears, she dreams of having princess-themed tea party for her birthday, only to be disappointed to learn that her family can't afford it. Jill then says she is too immature to understand how the war changes people's lives, to Helen’s disapproval.

During an air raid drill, James announces that he must go to London to help injured soldiers. Molly is furious that her father is leaving the family and going to an unsafe city, but he comforts her by calling Molly his "North Star" and telling her to look at the stars. Molly then decides she wants to be the school's "Miss Victory", the star in the school performance but she struggles to practice her tap dancing. Her classmate Allison, who also wants the spot, has been dancing since she was a toddler. Molly also gets chosen to represent her class in the school spelling bee.

When Molly's mother takes a job, the girls are looked after by their neighbor Mrs. Gilford, who is stern and obsessed with her son who is in the Navy. Soon after, the McIntires must take in a British girl named Emily Bennett who is the same age as Molly. At first, Emily is very shy and Molly doesn't want to live with her but Jill insists that Molly must learn to be accepting. After being peppered with too many questions about her home in London, Emily lies to Linda and Susan by saying that her parents were of royalty and she lived in "Bennett Manor." When Emily wakes up in the midst of a nightmare, she confesses to Molly that her father is a bus driver, her mother has died and she lived in a small apartment above a candy shop and was not rich or royal. Molly forgives her. When Molly sees her mother baking a casserole for Mrs. Gilford, she learns that her son had been killed at war and feels empathetic toward her. In the end of the movie, Molly and Emily both win the spelling bee and Molly is chosen to be Miss Victory. She also is very ecstatic to learn that although her father was injured, he is alive and only wounded in his leg.

Cast 
 Maya Ritter as Molly McIntire, the 10-year-old protagonist of the film.
 Tory Green as Emily Bennett, a girl from England who is taken in by Molly's family during the war.
 Hannah Fleming as Susan Shapiro, one of Molly's best friends.
 Samantha Somer Wilson as Linda Rinaldi, one of Molly's best friends.
Josette Halpert as Alison Hargate, a rich, popular girl in Molly's class.
 David Aaron Baker as Dr. James McIntire, Molly's father who was a doctor enlisted to go to England and help the wounded.
 Molly Ringwald as Helen McIntire, Molly's mother who took a job assembling war machinery after Mr. McIntire left.
 Genevieve Farrell as Jill McIntire, Molly's 14-year-old sister.
 Andrew Chalmers as Ricky McIntire, Molly's 12-year-old brother.
 Thomas Brodie-Sangster as boy in spelling bee

Production 
An American Girl on the Home Front was filmed in Unionville, Ontario, Canada.

References

External links

 An American Girl — official home page

2006 television films
2006 films
2000s English-language films
American Girl films
Films based on American novels
Films based on toys
Films directed by Joyce Chopra
Films set in 1943
Films set in 1944
Films set in Illinois
Films set on the home front during World War II
Warner Bros. films
American World War II films
American children's films
2000s American films
Films shot in Ontario
Cultural depictions of Elizabeth II